Theodore Anthony Gregory (born February 11, 1965) is a former professional American football defensive tackle who played one season for the New Orleans Saints in the National Football League. Gregory was drafted by the Denver Broncos following a sterling collegiate career at Syracuse.  Gregory listed his height as 6'1".  However, a shocked Dan Reeves, who is also listed as 6'1" commented, "I'm taller than he is!" upon meeting Gregory after the draft.  By Reeves' estimate, Gregory was closer to 5'9".  

Gregory had injured his knee in his last collegiate game, and the knee gave out during training camp.  Following scathing criticism from the press for wasting a pick on damaged goods, the Broncos traded him to the Saints for Shawn Knight before the season.  He is now regarded as one of the biggest draft busts in Broncos' history. After the Gregory incident the Broncos began meeting with potential draft picks prior to the draft, a practice they had not previously engaged in.

Gregory blew out his knee in this third game with the Saints, and never played in the NFL again.  After a series of failed business ventures drained his life savings, he took a job as a construction worker, only to have that end due to a ruptured disc in his back that temporarily rendered him a paraplegic. Gregory placed 8th in Deadspin's "The 100 Worst NFL Players of All Time".

References 

1965 births
Living people
All-American college football players
American football defensive tackles
New Orleans Saints players
Sportspeople from Queens, New York
Players of American football from New York City
Syracuse Orange football players